The Big Eight Conference is an athletic conference comprising medium-size high schools located in the Ozarks of southwest Missouri. The conference members are based around the Joplin and Springfield areas and are located in the counties of Barry, Barton, Greene, Lawrence, McDonald, Newton, Stone, Taney, Vernon, and Webster

List of member schools

History

1928
The conference was established as the Southwest Activities Association but was known as the Big 10. Founding members were: Aurora, Carthage, Joplin, Lamar, Monett, Mt. Vernon, Neosho, Nevada, Springfield and Webb City.

1953
The Big 10 changed to the Big 9 when Springfield and Joplin left the conference and Cassville was added.

1963
The Big 10 was re-established when Carl Junction was added.

1976
The Big 10 added McDonald County, East Newton, and Seneca to form the Big 13 Conference.

1979
Webb City leaves the conference for two years thus causing the renaming to the Big 12 Conference.

1981
Webb City is reinstated into the conference.  The conference is renamed the Big 13 Conference with schools divided into two divisions.

1982
Joplin (Memorial) lured Neosho, Webb City, Carthage, McDonald County, and Nevada to form the Big 6 Conference. The remaining schools formed the Big 8 Conference (Aurora, Carl Junction, Cassville, East Newton, Lamar, Monett, Mt. Vernon, and Seneca).

In 1985, Joplin Memorial merges with Joplin Parkwood to form Joplin High School and thus, the Big 6 Conference is renamed the Southwest Conference.  Teams are:  Joplin, Carthage, McDonald County, Neosho, Nevada, and Webb City.

2013
The Big 8 Conference voted to add McDonald County as its ninth member effective in July 2013.

2015
Carl Junction Leaves Big 8 Conference for the Central Ozarks Conference (Large).

2017
The Central Ozark Conference Small Division merged with the Big 8. Joining schools are: Logan-Rogersville, Springfield Catholic, Reeds Spring, Hollister, Marshfield and Nevada.

The Big 8 Conference was shaped into an East and West conference division.

The West Division includes: McDonald County, Monett, Nevada, Cassville, East Newton, Seneca, and Lamar

The East Division includes: Marshfield, Logan-Rogersville, Aurora, Reeds Spring, Springfield Catholic, Hollister, and Mt. Vernon.

State Championships

Aurora Houn' Dawgs
1964 Boys Track & Field (B)
1965 Boys Indoor Track (M)
1965 Football (M)
1969 Football (2A)
1999 Football (3A)
2017 Baseball (4)
2018 Baseball (4)

Cassville Wildcats
1984 Girls Track & Field (1A)
2008 Football (3)
2009 Football (3)

East Newton Patriots
1977 Boys Track & Field (2A)
1998 Volleyball (2A)
2022 Boys Track & Field (3A)

Hollister Tigers
1999 Boys Basketball (2A)

Lamar Tigers
2011 Football (2)
2012 Boys Cross Country (2)
2012 Football (2)
2013 Boys Track & Field (2)
2013 Football (2)
2014 Boys Track & Field (2)
2014 Football (2)
2015 Football (2)
2016 Boys Cross Country (2)
2016 Football (2)
2017 Boys Cross Country (2)
2017 Football (2)
2019 Football (2) 
2021 Football (2)

Logan-Rogersville Wildcats
1982 Boys Basketball (3A)
1998 Girls Cross Country (2A)
1999 Girls Cross Country (2A)
2000 Girls Cross Country (2A)
2011 Football (3)
2017 Boys Golf (3)
2018 Volleyball (3)

Marshfield Blue Jays
1988 Girls Basketball (3A)
1989 Girls Basketball (3A)
1990 Girls Basketball (3A)
1991 Girls Basketball (3A)
1996 Girls Basketball (3A)
1997 Girls Basketball (3A)
1999 Girls Basketball (3A)
1999 Softball (3A)

McDonald County
1981 Girls Basketball (3A)
1983 Girls Basketball (3A)

Monett Cubs
1971 Football (2A)
1977 Football (2A)
2008 Wrestling (2)
2016 Football (3)
2017 Softball (3)
2019 Wrestling (2)
2020 Wrestling (2)

Mt. Vernon Mountaineers
1947 Boys Track (B)
1978 Football (2A)
2002 Girls Golf (1)
2004 Boys Golf (2)
2005 Boys Golf (2)
2010 Girls Basketball (3)
2012 Girls Basketball (3)
2016 Girls Softball (1)

Nevada Tigers
1935 Boys Golf
1994 Girls Track & Field (3A)
2010 Softball (3)

Reeds Spring

Seneca Indians
1985 Wrestling (1A/2A)
1987 Football (2A)
1995 Football (3A)
2007 Cheerleading
2008 Cheerleading
2010 Wrestling (1)
2011 Cheerleading
2015 Cheerleading
2016 Cheerleading
2016 Wrestling (1)

Springield Catholic FIghting Irish
1983 Girls Basketball (1A)
1984 Boys Basketball (1A)
1990 Girls Basketball (2A)
1992 Girls Basketball (2A)
1993 Girls Basketball (2A)
1995 Boys Cross Country (1A-2A)
1997 Baseball (2A)
1997 Football (2A)
2010 Girls Cross Country (2)
2010 Girls Soccer (1)
2011 Girls Soccer (1)
2011 Boys Soccer (1)
2012 Boys Soccer (1)
2014 Baseball (3)
2015 Boys Cross Country (2)
2019 Girls Golf (1)

Neighboring Conferences
Ozark Conference
Central Ozark Conference
SouthWest Central League

See also
Missouri State High School Activities Association
List of high school athletic conferences in Missouri

References

Missouri high school athletic conferences
Barry County, Missouri
Barton County, Missouri
Jasper County, Missouri
Lawrence County, Missouri
Newton County, Missouri
Joplin, Missouri